Beyond the Core: Expand Your Market Without Abandoning Your Roots  is a non-fiction book by American business consultant Chris Zook. This is the second book in his Profit from the Core trilogy, followed by Unstoppable released in 2007.

Summary
Beyond the Core argues that businesses must grow to survive—but only one in five strategies for growth succeeds. In the previous book, Profit from the Core, Zook explains how to grow profitably by concentrating on and harvesting the full potential in the core business. But if the core business fails to provide new growth, managers should stick to an expansion strategy based on various combinations of adjacency moves into areas away from, but related to, the core business, such as new product lines or new channels of distribution. This strategy is less risky than diversification; however, it can still create a substantial competitive advantage because the growth is based on or relates to the pack of skills that the business already does best. Zook bases his research on studying thousands of companies worldwide and interviewing CEOs of 25 top performers that have succeeded growing beyond their core businesses.

Criticism

—Review by Product Development and Management Association

See also
 5 forces model
 Business models
 Competitive advantage
 Coopetition
 Core competency
 Strategic management
Value Migration: How to Think Several Moves Ahead of the Competition

References

External links
Official website

2004 non-fiction books
American non-fiction books
Business books
Harvard Business Publishing books